Physcaeneura leda is a butterfly in the family Nymphalidae. It is found along the coast of Kenya, as well as in north-eastern Tanzania and southern Somalia. The habitat consists of dense woodland, forest margins and grassy forest clearings from sea-level to 1,850 meters.

The larvae feed on Poaceae species.

References

Satyrini
Butterflies described in 1871
Butterflies of Africa
Taxa named by Carl Eduard Adolph Gerstaecker